Chad James Ruhwedel (born May 7, 1990) is an American professional ice hockey defenseman under contract for the Pittsburgh Penguins of the National Hockey League (NHL).

Playing career
Ruhwedel started playing youth ice hockey at the San Diego Ice Arena while a resident of Scripps Ranch.  He later played for the San Diego Junior Gulls and La Jolla Jaguars as a youth, before playing for the Los Angeles Kings U18 AAA team.  After juniors, he played for the Sioux Falls Stampede of the USHL, earning a Division I college hockey scholarship to UMass Lowell. Ruhwedel played at UMass Lowell from 2010 to 2013. He was named to the Hockey East All-Academic Team in 2010–11, 2011–12, and 2012–13. In 2011–12 he was a Hockey East Honorable Mention All-Star, and in 2012–13 he was a Hockey East First-Team All-Star, and an AHCA East First-Team All-American. He also won the Bob Monahan Award as the best defenseman in New England.

On April 13, 2013, Ruhwedel signed a two-year entry-level contract as an undrafted free agent with the Buffalo Sabres. On the same day, he made his NHL debut for the Sabres in a game against the Philadelphia Flyers.

On July 16, 2014 Ruhwedel signed a two-year contract to remain with the Sabres organization.

At the conclusion of his contract with the Sabres, on July 1, 2016, Ruhwedel signed as a free agent to a one-year, two-way deal with the reigning Stanley Cup champions, the Pittsburgh Penguins. He scored his first National Hockey League goal on December 23, 2016 in a 4–1 victory over the New Jersey Devils. He split his time during 2016–17 season playing 28 games in minors for Wilkes-Barre/Scranton Penguins, and 34 games Pittsburgh in the NHL.  He would play 6 playoff games.  Ruhwedel suffered a concussion in game 4 of the Eastern Conference Finals against the Ottawa Senators, and missed the rest of the season. The Penguins would go on to win the Stanley Cup for the second straight season; since Ruhwedel spent 1/3 of the season in the American Hockey League (AHL), he did not get his name on the cup. Pittsburgh did give him a day with the Stanley Cup, and a Stanley Cup ring.

On June 22, 2017, the Penguins re-signed Ruhwedel to a two-year, $1.3 million extension with an annual average value of $650,000.

On February 19, 2022, the Penguins re-signed Ruhwedel to a two-year, $1.6 million extension with an annual average value of $800,000.

Personal
Chad Ruhwedel was raised in the Scripps Ranch area of San Diego and attended Scripps Ranch High School, where he starred on the roller hockey team.

Career statistics

Awards and honors

References

External links
 

1990 births
American men's ice hockey defensemen
Buffalo Sabres players
Ice hockey players from California
Living people
Pittsburgh Penguins players
Rochester Americans players
Sioux Falls Stampede players
Sportspeople from San Diego
Stanley Cup champions
UMass Lowell River Hawks men's ice hockey players
Undrafted National Hockey League players
Wilkes-Barre/Scranton Penguins players
AHCA Division I men's ice hockey All-Americans